The Army Group Mackensen which operated in Poland between 22 April 1915 and 8 September 1915 during World War I under the command of Field Marshal , was an army group of the Imperial German Army.

On 8 September 1915 it was renamed Army Group  when  became its new commander. In June 1916, the Army Group faced the Brusilov Offensive. After an initial retreat, it checked the Russian advance at the Battle of Kowel. After the signing of the Treaty of Brest-Litovsk in March 1918, the Army Group occupied Ukraine.

It was again renamed on 3 April to Army Group  and a last time on 13 August to Army Group Kiev after the murder of General . The Army Group was disbanded on 7 February 1919.

Composition April – September 1915 
 German Eleventh Army
 Austro-Hungarian Fourth Army (Archduke Joseph Ferdinand of Austria)
 Austro-Hungarian Second Army, from June 1915
 German Army of the Bug (Alexander von Linsingen), from 8 July 1915

Composition September 1915 – March 1918 
 Austro-Hungarian Fourth Army (Archduke Joseph Ferdinand of Austria, succeeded by )
 German Bug Army

Sources 
 
  on Genealogy.de

Mackensen
Mackensen Poland
Military units and formations established in 1915
Military units and formations disestablished in 1919